The Independence Hills are a line of rugged hills and peaks,  long, with mainly bare rock eastern slopes. The Independence Hills were mapped by the United States Geological Survey from ground surveys and U.S. Navy air photos, 1961–66. The name was applied by the Advisory Committee on Antarctic Names in association with the name "Heritage Range".

Features
Geographical features include:

 Marble Hills
 Horseshoe Valley
 Morris Cliff
 Mount Geissel
 Mount Shattuck
 Mount Simmons
 Patriot Hills
 Redpath Peaks

References

Hills of Ellsworth Land